The Field Elm cultivar Ulmus minor 'Viminalis Stricta' (:'narrow'), formerly known as U. campestris var. viminalis stricta, is a fastigiate form of Ulmus minor 'Viminalis'. A herbarium specimen at Kew labelled U. campestris var. viminalis f. stricta  was considered by Melville a form of his U. × viminalis.

Description
A tree of narrow and "very rigid" growth. A herbarium leaf-specimen shows a leaf resembling that of the type tree, 'Viminalis' (see External links below).

Pests and diseases
Trees of the U. minor 'Viminalis' group are very susceptible to Dutch elm disease.

Cultivation

No specimens are known to survive. There was a 'Viminals Stricta' at Kew Gardens in the early 20th century.

Non-ornamental trees identified as Melville's U. × viminalis and matching the form of 'Stricta' occur in East Anglia.

Notable trees
A fine specimen noted by Henry at Milton Abbey, Dorset, in 1913 of what he called U. campestris var. viminalis, which "resembled in habit the Cornish elm", may have been a form of  U. minor 'Viminalis' similar to 'Stricta'.

References

External links
 Sheet described as U. procera Salisb. var. viminalis Rehd. f. stricta (Kew specimen)
 Sheet described as U. procera viminalis stricta (Kew specimen, 1931)
  

Field elm cultivar
Ulmus